Sânnicolau may refer to several places in Romania:

Sânnicolau Mare, a town in Timiș County
Sânnicolau Român, a commune in Bihor County
Sânnicolau de Munte, a village in Săcueni town, Bihor County
Sânnicolau de Beiuș, a village in Șoimi Commune, Bihor County
Sânnicolau (river), a tributary of the Barcău in Bihor County